Willem Poolman (born 8 October 1778 – 14 June 1823) was a Dutch military officer and colonial administrator on the Gold Coast.

Biography 
Willem Poolman was born in Amsterdam to Willem Poolman senior and Catharina Groen. He became a military officer and was eventually installed Commander of the Dutch Gold Coast on 31 December 1821. Poolman arrived in Elmina on 28 May 1822 and was installed on 6 June. Willem Poolman died in office on 14 June 1823.

Personal life 
Willem Poolman married Elsje Harmsen in 1803. Their son Willem Poolman junior (1809–1873) was a member of parliament and founder of the Netherlands East Indies Railway Company.

References 

1778 births
1823 deaths
Colonial governors of the Dutch Gold Coast